This is a list of the National Register of Historic Places listings in Cache County, Utah.

This is intended to be a complete list of the properties and districts on the National Register of Historic Places in Cache County, Utah, United States.  Latitude and longitude coordinates are provided for many National Register properties and districts; these locations may be seen together in a map.

There are 77 properties and districts listed on the National Register in the county. Another 5 sites in the county were once listed, but have since been removed.



Current listings

|}

Former listings

|}

See also
 List of National Historic Landmarks in Utah
 National Register of Historic Places listings in Utah

References

External links

Cache
Cache County, Utah